Royal Air Force Zeals or more simply RAF Zeals is a former Royal Air Force station in Wiltshire, sited to the north of the village of Zeals, next to the village of Stourton and the Stourhead estate.

History 
The station was in operation from 1942 to 1946, and was successively occupied by the Royal Air Force, the United States Army Air Force and the Royal Navy.

From opening until August 1943 the site was used by the RAF as an airfield for Hawker Hurricane and Supermarine Spitfire fighters.

In August 1943 it was transferred to the United States Army Air Force with the intention of using the airfield for maintenance of Douglas C-47 Skytrain transport aircraft. However, the damp conditions prevented the operation of heavy aircraft, so Republic P-47 Thunderbolt fighters were flown from Zeals instead.

From March 1944, it returned to the RAF who used it as a fighter airfield for de Havilland Mosquito fighters against German bombers.

Following D-Day, the RAF used the airfield for military glider training in preparation for action against Japan.  In April 1945 the station was taken over by the Royal Navy (as HMS Hummingbird or RNAS Zeals) who used the airfield for aircraft carrier training.

The airfield was closed down from January 1946 and in June it was returned to farmland.  The control tower, now a private house, remains on Bells Lane in Zeals.

Dakota crash – 19 February 1945

A Douglas Dakota III crashed on 19 February 1945, killing more than twenty people. The aircraft had taken off from Zeals airfield to return to Lincolnshire after two weeks of glider training and flew into some cloud-covered beech trees on a knoll.

The site of the crash is marked by a memorial which was erected by the Wiltshire Historical Military Society.

Units

Units

See also
List of former Royal Air Force stations

References

Citations

Bibliography

Zeals
Zeals
1945 disasters in the United Kingdom
Aviation accidents and incidents locations in England